Björn Lans is a Swedish ski-orienteering competitor and world champion.

Ski orienteering
He competed at the 1996 World Ski Orienteering Championships in Lillehammer, where he received a gold medal in the short distance, and also a gold medal in the relay event, together with Per-Ove Bergqvist, Mikael Lindmark and Bertil Nordqvist.

At the World Cup in Ski Orienteering in 1999 Lans finished overall second, behind winner Raino Pesu.

References

Year of birth missing (living people)
Living people
Swedish orienteers
Male orienteers
Ski-orienteers